2023 Abu Dhabi T10 will be the seventh season of the Abu Dhabi T10. The matches will have a 10-over-a-side format with a time duration of 90 minutes. The tournament will be played from 28 November to 9 December 2023 at the Sheikh Zayed Cricket Stadium.

References

2023 in Emirati cricket
Abu Dhabi T10 League